Adi ibn Artah al-Fazari (died 720) was a governor of Basra for the Umayyad dynasty, serving during the caliphate of 'Umar ibn 'Abd al-'Aziz. He was killed during the revolt of Yazid ibn al-Muhallab.

Career under Umar II 
Adi was appointed to the governorship of Basra by the caliph Umar II, shortly after the latter's ascension in 717. After receiving his appointment, he established himself in Basra; he also ordered the arrest of his predecessor Yazid ibn al-Muhallab, who Umar had dismissed from the governorship of Iraq. Once Yazid was captured, Adi shipped him to the caliph's residence in Syria, where he was cast into prison.

Adi served as governor of Basra for the duration of Umar's caliphate. Unlike Yazid, who had been governor of all of Iraq and the eastern provinces, Adi did not have authority over Kufa and Khurasan, which were placed under separate governors. His area of responsibility, however, was still considerable, and extended from Basra and Bahrayn in the west to Sind in the east. Oman was also initially under Adi's authority, but Umar revoked his jurisdiction over it after receiving complaints about his lieutenant's administration there.

During Adi's governorship, he authorized public works projects in Basra; a canal was dug to provide water to the city's residents and was named after him. A second canal which was completed was named after Adi's chief of police. He also wanted to enlarge the governor's residence in the city, but was reportedly dissuaded from doing so by Umar. During his administration, a plague struck in 718-719 and was named the "plague of Adi ibn Artah."

The Muhallabid revolt 
Shortly after the death of Umar in February 720, Adi received a message from the new caliph Yazid II informing him that Yazid ibn al-Muhallab had escaped from prison and that he was likely heading toward Iraq. On the caliph's orders, Adi arrested and imprisoned the Muhallabids who were in Basra and prepared for an confrontation with Yazid; the local army was organized and a trench was dug around the city.

As Yazid advanced toward Basra, however, Adi's defense began to fall apart. Many of his men refused to fight against Yazid, and contingents that were sent out to stop his march instead allowed him to pass by unmolested. Yazid also began offering higher stipends to the Basrans, which increased his popularity among them. Consequently, when he arrived at Basra he was able to enter the city without much difficulty. The Syrians and Basrans who remained loyal to Adi attempted to mount a defense outside the fortress of Basra, but they were defeated and the fortress was stormed by Yazid's men. The remainder of Adi's forces fled to Kufa; Adi himself was captured and brought before Yazid, who ordered his confinement.

Following Yazid's conquest of Basra, Adi was transferred to Wasit, which was put under the command of Yazid's son Mu'awiya. He remained incarcerated there until Yazid was killed in battle against Maslama ibn Abd al-Malik in August 720. When news of Yazid's fate reached Wasit, Mu'awiya took out a number of prisoners under his charge, including Adi and his son Muhammad, and executed them in retaliation for his father's death.

Notes

References 
Al-Baladhuri, Ahmad ibn Jabir. The Origins of the Islamic State, Part II. Trans. Francis Clark Murgotten. New York: Columbia University, 1924.
Dols, Michael W. "Plague in Early Islamic History." Journal of the American Oriental Society 94.3 (1974): 371–383. 
Ibn Khallikan, Shams al-Din Abu al-Abbas Ahmad ibn Muhammad. Ibn Khallikan's Biographical Dictionary, Vol. IV. Trans. Bn. Mac Guckin de Slane. Paris: Oriental Translation Fund of Great Britain and Ireland, 1871.
Ibn Kutaybah, Abu Muhammad 'Abd Allah ibn Muslim. Al-Ma'arif. Ed. Tharwat Ukasha. 2nd ed. Cairo: Dar al-Ma'arif, 1969.
Khalifah ibn Khayyat. Tarikh Khalifah ibn Khayyat. Ed. Akram Diya' al-'Umari. 3rd ed. Al-Riyadh: Dar Taybah, 1985. 
Al-Mas'udi, Ali ibn al-Husain. Les Prairies D'Or, Tome Cinquième. Trans. C. Barbier de Meynard. Paris: Imprimerie Nationale, 1869.

Al-Rawas, Isam. Oman in Early Islamic History. Reading, UK: Garnet Publishing Limited, 2000. 
Shaban, M. A. Islamic History A.D. 600-750 (AH 132): A New Interpretation. Cambridge: Cambridge University Press, 1971.  
Al-Ya'qubi, Ahmad ibn Abu Ya'qub. Historiae, Vol. 2. Ed. M. Th. Houtsma. Leiden: E. J. Brill, 1883.

Year of birth unknown
720 deaths
Umayyad governors of Basra
8th-century executions by the Umayyad Caliphate
8th-century people from the Umayyad Caliphate
8th-century Arabs